West Gladstone may refer to:
West Gladstone, Queensland in Australia
West Gladstone, Michigan in the United States of America